Revalotrypa is an extinct genus of bryozoan of the family Revalotrypidae that lived during the late Ordovician period. It was initially placed within the order Trepostomatida, but later moved to Cystoporida, a classification supported by the discovery of the very similar genus Lynnopora, which possesses lunaria in its autozooidal apertures, a quality distinctive of Cystoporida.

Species
The following species are recognized:

References

Prehistoric bryozoan genera